Viktor Růžička (10 March 1943–2013) was a Czech cinematographer.

Selected filmography

Cinematographer
Balada pro banditu (1978)
Drsná planina (1979)
Jen si tak trochu písknout (1980)
Tajemství hradu v Karpatech (1981)
Jako zajíci (1981)
Poslední leč (1981)
Má láska s Jakubem (1982)
Šílený kankán (1982)
Straka v hrsti (1983)
Vrak (1983)
Prodavač humoru (1984)
Zastihla mě noc (1985)
Čarovné dědictví (1985)
Dva na koni, jeden na oslu (1986)
Cobra Verde (1987)
Marta a já (1990)
Lepšie byť bohatý a zdravý ako chudobný a chorý (1992)
Nesmrtelná teta (1993)

References

External links 
 

1943 births
2013 deaths
Czech cinematographers
Mass media people from Prague